John Lee Clark (born 1978) is an American deafblind poet, writer, and activist from Minnesota. He is the author of Suddenly Slow (2008) and Where I Stand: On the Signing Community and My DeafBlind Experience (2014), and the editor of anthologies Deaf American Poetry (2009)  and Deaf Lit Extravaganza (2013). Clark was the recipient of a 2020 National Magazine Award. He is a prominent activist in the Protactile movement.

Early life and education 
Clark was born into a Deaf and signing family and became blind later in life. His native language is American Sign Language, and he did not learn to read English until he was twelve years old. He started to become blind as an adolescent. He is a second-generation DeafBlind person.

Clark graduated from the Minnesota State Academy for the Deaf and attended Gallaudet University.

Career 
Clark is a Braille and ProTactile instructor in Minnesota.

Works 
Clark is the author of two books of poems, Suddenly Slow (2008) and How to Communicate (2022), and a collection of essays, Where I Stand: On the Signing Community and My DeafBlind Experience (Handtype Press, 2014). He is the editor of anthologies Deaf American Poetry (Gallaudet University Press, 2009)  and Deaf Lit Extravaganza (Handtype Press, 2013). His work is included in the anthologies Beauty Is a Verb: The New Poetry of Disability, Deaf American Prose, St. Paul Almanac, and The Nodin Anthology of Poetry.

Clark gave a performative demonstration of protactile poetry at the April 2019 festival I wanna be with you everywhere at Performance Space New York. Using protactile language, he delivered poetry on stage alongside fellow DeafBlind poets Rhonda Voight-Campbell and Hayley Broadway.

Clark is a frequent contributor to Poetry magazine and maintains a blog on his website, where he frequently writes short essays on DeafBlind subjects.

Activism and views 
Clark has expressed frustrations with the limited range of literature available in Braille. He advocates for shorter copyright terms after authors' deaths in order for texts to be accessible in more formats. Clark says reading mostly older literature, due to that being the main thing he has been able to access, has influenced his writing and style.

Clark wrote an article for The Chronicle of Higher Education in 2010 critical of the failure of colleges to accommodate blind and DeafBlind students.

Clark is an activist for the advancement of ProTactile, a fully kinesthetic language.

Recognition and awards 
Clark has won grants and fellowships from the Minnesota State Arts Board, VSA Minnesota, the Laurent Clerc Cultural Fund, Intermedia Arts Center, and The Loft Literary Center. He was a featured writer at the Deaf Way II International Cultural Arts Festival, and was a finalist for the 2016 Split This Rock Freedom Plow Award for Poetry and Activism. Clark's essay "Tactile Art" appeared in Poetry magazine in October 2019 and won the 2020 National Magazine Award for Essays and Criticism.

Personal life 
Clark has Usher syndrome. He is married to the artist Adrean Clark and they have three sons.

References

External links
Clark's blog
Clark performing the poem "The Rebuttal". YouTube

1978 births
Living people
Poets from Minnesota
Gallaudet University alumni
American disability rights activists
American deafblind people
Blind poets
Deaf poets
21st-century American poets
American male poets
21st-century American male writers
Activists from Minnesota